Ze'ev Zeltzer (born 9 February 1944) is an Israeli former footballer and current manager. As a player, he represented Maccabi Petah Tikva and the Israeli national team twice.

Honours as Manager
Israeli Second Division (1):
1977-78
Israel State Cup (1):
1992

References

1944 births
Living people
Israeli Jews
Israeli footballers
Footballers from Petah Tikva
Maccabi Petah Tikva F.C. players
Israel international footballers
Israeli football managers
Maccabi Petah Tikva F.C. managers
Bnei Yehuda Tel Aviv F.C. managers
Maccabi Tel Aviv F.C. managers
Maccabi Yavne F.C. managers
Maccabi Netanya F.C. managers
Beitar Jerusalem F.C. managers
Hapoel Petah Tikva F.C. managers
Maccabi Ironi Ashdod F.C. managers
Maccabi Herzliya F.C. managers
Association football midfielders